James S. "Uncle Jim" Remsen (October 1811, Queens Village, New York – August 21, 1887) was a landowner and developer of Rockaway Beach, Queens as a major amusement district in the 19th century. He is also known for his development of Canarsie and East New York in Brooklyn.

Remsen managed to acquire title to a large portion of the peninsula, and was known to promulgate a railroad project linking the Canarsie and East New York neighborhoods, which provided ferry passengers to Rockaway Beach. He took William Wainwright, who was to become a prominent Rockaway developer in his own right, as a partner in 1876.

References

Seyfried, Vincent F., The Long Island Rail Road: A Comprehensive History, Part Five, published by the author, Garden City, Long Island, 1966.

1811 births
1887 deaths
19th-century American businesspeople
Date of birth missing
Land owners and developers in Rockaway, Queens
People from Queens, New York
Place of death missing
American people of Dutch descent